Sedaka's Back is a compilation album by American singer-songwriter Neil Sedaka. The record, composed of selections from his previous three albums, which had been released only in the UK, was released on Elton John's label, The Rocket Record Company, in 1974.  Three singles were released from this album: "Laughter in the Rain" (a #1 hit), "The Immigrant" (dedicated to John Lennon) and "That's When the Music Takes Me." The latter two songs were both Top 40 hits. Also included were songs that were turned into hits by other artists: "Solitaire" (The Carpenters) and "Love Will Keep Us Together" (The Captain & Tennille).  The album reached No. 23 on the US Billboard album charts and was certified Gold for shipping half a million sales.

Track listing

Source of tracks
Tracks 1, 6, 7, 10, 12, and {16} were derived from The Tra-La Days Are Over
Tracks 2 and 5 were derived from the album Solitaire
Tracks 3, 4, 8, 9, 11, {13}, {14}, and {15} were derived from the album Laughter in the Rain

US Singles Releases
 "Standing On The Inside" saw a 45 rpm release as the B-side of "That's When The Music Takes Me"; however, the version of "Standing On The Inside" heard on the single is a different version from the album version.
 "That's When The Music Takes Me" saw a 45 rpm release in 1974 and scored a No. 27 on the Billboard Hot 100 in 1975.
 "Laughter In The Rain" saw a 45 rpm release in 1974 and scored No. 1 on the Adult Contemporary charts in 1974 and No. 1 on the Billboard Hot 100 in 1975.
 "The Immigrant" was released on a 45 rpm single in 1974 and scored a No. 22 on the Billboard Hot 100 and a No. 1 on the Adult Contemporary charts in 1975.
 "Endlessly" served as the B-side of "Laughter In The Rain".

Many of the other songs on this album saw singles releases in the UK and throughout Europe.

Personnel

 Neil Sedaka – organ, piano, keyboards, vocals, clavinet, vibraphone
 Ben Benay – guitar
 Eric Stewart – guitar, backing vocals, engineer
 Lol Creme – guitars, backing vocals
 Kevin Godley – drums, percussion, backing vocals
 Graham Gouldman – bass, guitar, backing vocals
 Milt Holland – percussion
 Jim Horn – horn arrangements
 Dick Hyde – horn
 Danny Kortchmar – guitar
 Russ Kunkel – percussion, drums
 Don Menza – horn
 Del Newman – string arrangements
 Dean Parks – acoustic guitar, Dobro
 Brenda Russell –  backing vocals
 Brian Russell – backing vocals
 Leland Sklar – bass
 William Smith – keyboards, backing vocals
 Chuck Findley – trumpet, horn, horn arrangements

Certifications

References

Neil Sedaka compilation albums
1974 compilation albums
The Rocket Record Company compilation albums